Gorna Sushitsa is a village in Sandanski Municipality, in Blagoevgrad Province, Bulgaria. It is situated at the south-western foothills of the Pirin mountain range and is nestled in the Melnik Earth Pyramids.

References

Villages in Blagoevgrad Province